Ottavio Michelini (14 August 1906 – 15 October 1979) of Mirandola, Italy was an Italian Roman Catholic priest, considered to be a mystic. In 1975, he began to publish books pertaining to his visions of Jesus and Mary.

Michelini was a priest of the Diocese of Carpi, which obtained for him in 1967 the title of Monsignor as a Chaplain of His Holiness.

After his retirement, he spent the last years of his priestly ministry as a chaplain to an association of disabled people. He was a vital part of the new Marian Movement of Priests, founded by Stefano Gobbi in 1973, who himself reported interior locutions. Starting in 1975, and for the last four years of life, he claimed to have received messages in the form of interior locutions and visions of Jesus and the Madonna.  The messages were later published in a series of six volumes entitled "confidences of Jesus to a priest".

The "confidence" of Jesus denounced the seriousness of the spiritual and moral issues facing the world today, the confusion and rebellion within the church, highlights the shortcomings of the current ministry, as well as explaining that many of these problems are direct consequence of the profound crisis of faith that pervades the church today.  Furthermore, he claimed that the Lord revealed a future "cleansing" that followed "a new springtime of peace and justice for humanity and for the Church", a radiant dawn, never known before", Inauguration a "mid-term coming of Jesus" before the final one at the end of the world.

On the writings of Maria Valtorta, whose Poem of the Man God was placed on the Index of Forbidden Books in 1960, he claimed that Jesus dictated to him the following quote:

I have dictated to Maria Valtorta, a victim soul, a marvelous work (The Poem of the Man God). Of this work I am the Author. You yourself, Son, have taken account of the raging reactions of Satan.... You have verified the resistance that many priests oppose to this work. This also proves, Son, that he who has not sensed in the Poem the savor of the Divine, the perfume of the Supernatural, has a soul encumbered and darkened. If it were – I do not say "read" --but studied and meditated, it would bring an immense good to souls. This work is a well-spring of serious and solid culture.... This is a work willed by Wisdom and Divine Providence for the new times. …It is I, the Word living and eternal, Who have given Myself anew as nourishment to the souls that I love. I, Myself, am the Light, and the Light cannot be confused with, and still less blend Itself with, the darkness. Where I am found, the darkness is dissolved to make room for the Light.   . Message from 19th september 1975.

The particular Michelini book from which this quotation was taken is called La medida está colmada in its Spanish version and remains in the library of The Archidiocesan Minor Seminary of Monterrey in the city of San Pedro Garza García. The first page of the book has a seal that reads "Biblioteca Seminario Menor de Monterrey Donativo del Sr. Emmo. Adolfo Antonio Cardenal Suárez Rivera", ("Library of the Minor Seminary of Monterrey Donated by Sr. Eminentísimo Adolfo Cardinal Suárez Rivera"). This Spanish edition of Michelini's writings where supposedly Christ himself defends Valtorta's Work, comes with a copy of two letters between bishops (within the first pages). The first letter is from the Bishop of León, México Anselmo Zarza Bernal and is addressed to Miguel García Franco who was at the time Bishop of Mazatlán. The response to Bernal is the second letter. In the first letter, Bernal recommends to Franco the reading and reflection of Michelini's book (where among many supposed dictations from Christ, there is one defending Valtorta's work), on response (second letter) Franco wrote: "I received your letter...that came with the book" (Michelini's Book) "...I find all the doctrine contained in the book 100% orthodox, more yet, in whole coincident with the writings of Mrs. Conchita Cabrera de Armida..." (the Venerable Concepción Cabrera de Armida a Mexican mystic in the process of canonization) "... and with the book of Father Esteban Gobbi (In Italian Stefano Gobbi), books for which we have ecclesiastic aprobation".

References

Bibliography 

 Monsignor Don Ottavio Michelini, 1975  A Mandate From our Lord, Jesus Christ to a Priest  ASIN: B000WX9I8K

External links 
 Apostolat.org 

1906 births
Roman Catholic writers
1979 deaths
Italian religious writers
20th-century Italian non-fiction writers
20th-century Italian male writers
20th-century Italian Roman Catholic priests
People from Mirandola
Italian male non-fiction writers